Sofie Joosen (born April 7, 1986 ) is a Belgian politician for the N-VA.

Joosen trained as a dental assistant before getting involved in politics. She was a board member for the N-VA in her hometown of Duffel and was co-founder of the local Jong N-VA youth wing branch. In the municipal elections of 2012, she was elected as a municipal councilor of Duffel. After the municipal elections of 2018, Joosen became mayor of Duffel, making her the youngest mayor of a town in Belgium at the time. Since the 2014 Belgian regional elections, she has been a member of the Flemish Parliament for the Antwerp list. In the parliament, she focuses on matters related to housing.

References

Living people
1986 births
Members of the Flemish Parliament
New Flemish Alliance politicians
21st-century Belgian women politicians
21st-century Belgian politicians